Abdallah Zakher el-Shammas (1684–1748) was a Syrian-born typographer and Catholic deacon who set up the first printing press in the Middle East.

His printing press used Arabic movable type and was installed in 1733 in the motherhouse of the Basilian Chouerite Order, the monastery of Saint John the Baptist at Choueir in Mount Lebanon, where it still can be visited.

Zakher was also an accomplished writer and craftsman. He was a Melkite Christian at the time of the Church's reaffirmation of communion with the Catholic Church.

References

Sources
 “The First Arabic Script Printing Press in Lebanon”, an article by Pascal Zoghbi, with pictures from the Zakher foundry.
Tourist attractions report of Lebanon mentioning Zakher
Intro to book on Zakher
Jules Leroy and Peter Collin, Monks and Monasteries of the Near East (Gorgias Press, 2004), p. 122-123

1684 births
1748 deaths
Lebanese Melkite Greek Catholics
Typographers and type designers
People from Aleppo